Gary T. K. Ng (born 6 Dec 1952), is a horse trainer. He has been training in Hong Kong since 1990/91. In 2010/11 he trained 15 winners which pushed his career total to 417.

Significant horses
 Sweet Sanette

Performance

References
The Hong Kong Jockey Club – Trainer Information
The Hong Kong Jockey Club 

Hong Kong horse trainers
Living people
1952 births